2012 Commonwealth of Independent States Cup was the 20th annual Commonwealth of Independent States Cup since its establishment in 1993. It was hosted in Saint Petersburg, Russia between 19 and 29 January 2012.

Saint Petersburg hosted the event for the third time, with all matches being held in a single venue (Saint Petersburg Sports and Concert Complex). For this edition of the tournament the format of the competition was changed. All participating nations were represented by their youth (U20/U21) national teams, rather than by champions of domestic leagues.

Format
Group stage
Twelve teams were divided into three groups of four. The top two of each group qualified automatically for a play-off along with the two best third placed teams. The other third placed team along with the three bottom participants out of each group proceed to the group which would place its members between the 9th through the 12th places.

Playoffs
The winners of the quarter finals advanced further into semi-finals, while the other four less fortunate entered play-off for the fifth place. Next the winners of the semi-finals advanced to the final, while the other two participants played for the third place. Simultaneously the winners of the play-off for the fifth place continued to the fifth place match, while the other two played for the seventh place.

Participants

Group stage

Group A

Results
All times UTC+3

Group B

Results
All times UTC+3

Group C

Results
All times UTC+3

Consolation round

Places 9 to 12

Results

Final stages

Bracket

Quarterfinals

Places 5 to 8

Semifinals

7th place match

5th place match

3rd place match

Final

Final standing

Top scorers

References

External links 
 
 Russian Football Union Official web-site 

2011–12 in Russian football
2011–12 in Ukrainian football
2012 in Saint Petersburg
2011
January 2012 sports events in Russia